Ancistrus patronus is a species of catfish in the family Loricariidae. It is native to South America, where it occurs in the Orinoco basin in Venezuela. The species reaches at least 8.6 cm (3.4 inches) SL and was described in 2019 by Lesley S. de Souza of the Field Museum of Natural History, Donald C. Taphorn of the Royal Ontario Museum, and Jonathan Armbruster of Auburn University alongside five other species of Ancistrus. Its specific name means "defender" in Latin and was given to the species due to the reported tendency of male A. patronus to actively guard their nests and protect their young until they are relatively large.

References 

patronus
Fish described in 2019
Fish of Venezuela
Catfish of South America